Ridgway Building is a historic commercial building located in downtown Evansville, Indiana. It was built in 1860 and remodeled in 1895, and is a -story brick building. It features -story buff brick arched bays and orange terra cotta ornamentation.

It was added to the National Register of Historic Places in 1980.

References

Commercial buildings on the National Register of Historic Places in Indiana
Commercial buildings completed in 1860
Buildings and structures in Evansville, Indiana
National Register of Historic Places in Evansville, Indiana